The Zaslavskii map is a discrete-time dynamical system introduced by George M. Zaslavsky.   It is an example of a dynamical system that exhibits chaotic behavior.  The Zaslavskii map takes a point in the plane and maps it to a new point:

and

where mod is the modulo operator with real arguments. The map depends on four constants ν, μ, ε and r. Russel (1980) gives a Hausdorff dimension of 1.39 but Grassberger (1983) questions this value based on their difficulties measuring the correlation dimension.

See also
 List of chaotic maps

References
  (LINK)
  (LINK)
   (LINK)

Chaotic maps